Seghers is a surname. Notable people with this surname include:

 Anna Seghers (1900–1983), German writer
 Anne-Marie Seghers (1911–2012), French tennis player
 Armand Seghers (1926–2005), Belgian footballer
 Carroll Seghers II (1924–2004), American photographer
 Charles John Seghers (1839–1886), Belgian clergyman and missionary
 Daniel Seghers (1590–1661), Flemish Jesuit and painter
 Emilius Seghers (1855–1927), Belgian bishop
 Gerard Seghers (1591–1651), Flemish painter
 Hercules Seghers ( 1589 – c. 1638), Dutch painter and printmaker
 Jean Seghers, Belgian racewalker
 Pierre Seghers (1906–1987), French poet and editor
 Samuel Seghers (born 1994), Papua New Guinean swimmer

See also 
 Related surnames
 Seger
 Seeger
 Segers
 Zegers
 Segert

Dutch-language surnames
Patronymic surnames